The Men's Triple Jump event at the 1990 European Championships in Split, Yugoslavia was held at Stadion Poljud on 30 and 31 August 1990. There were a total number of nineteen participating athletes.

Medalists

Abbreviations
All results shown are in metres

Records

Results

Final
31 August

Qualification
30 AugustQualification distance: 16.90 (Q) or 12 best (q) qualified for the final

Group A

Group B

Participation
According to an unofficial count, 19 athletes from 12 countries participated in the event.

 (1)
 (1)
 (1)
 (2)
 (3)
 (1)
 (2)
 (3)
 (2)
 (1)
 (1)
 (1)

See also
 1988 Men's Olympic Triple Jump (Seoul)
 1991 Men's World Championships Triple Jump (Tokyo)
 1992 Men's Olympic Triple Jump (Barcelona)

References

 Results
 todor66

Triple jump
Triple jump at the European Athletics Championships